HMS Halsted, sometimes spelled Halstead, has been the name of more than one ship of the British Royal Navy, and may refer to:

 , a frigate in commission from 1944 to 1945 that was briefly named HMS Halsted in 1943 while under construction
 , a frigate in commission from 1943 to 1946

Royal Navy ship names